Omid Ghorbani; is an Iranian defender who currently plays for the Iranian football club Saba Qom in the Iran Pro League.

Club career

Badr Bandar Kong
He started his career with Badr Bandar Kong from youth levels. He made his debut for Badr Bandar Kong on September 25, 2013 against Mes Rafsanjan as a starter.

Saba Qom
He joined Saba Qom on June 2, 2014 with a 3-year contract. He made his debut against Zob Ahan on July 31, 2014 as a starter.

Club career statistics

International career

U23
He was invited to the Iran U-23 training camp by Nelo Vingada to prepare for Incheon 2014 and 2016 AFC U-22 Championship (Summer Olympic qualification).

References

External links
 Omid Ghorbani at PersianLeague.com
 Omid Ghorbani at IranLeague.ir

1993 births
Living people
Iranian footballers
Saba players
People from Karaj
Association football midfielders
21st-century Iranian people